Andrew Riemer (29 February 1936 – 5 June 2020) was an Australian literary critic and author, for three decades the book reviewer of the Sydney Morning Herald. Born in Budapest, he moved to Sydney at age 11. He lectured in English at the University of Sydney and later won widespread recognition for his non-fiction and literary criticism, including the Pascall Prize for critical writing in 1999.

References

1936 births
2020 deaths
Australian literary critics
20th-century Australian writers
Writers from Sydney